Cretogonalys is an extinct genus of wasp which existed in Siberia during the late Cretaceous period. It was described by Rasnitsyn in 1977.

Species
 Cretogonalys taimyricus Rasnitsyn, 1977

References

Stephanoidea
Cretaceous insects of Asia
Hymenoptera of Asia
Prehistoric Hymenoptera genera